Daniel McMillan may refer to:

 Daniel Hunter McMillan (1846–1933), Manitoba politician
 Daniel H. McMillan (American politician) (1846–1908), New York State Senator and New Mexico Territorial Supreme Court
 Daniel McMillan (handballer) (born 1982), British handball player

See also 
 Daniel Macmillan (disambiguation)